Six-man football is a variant of gridiron football played with six players per team, instead of the standard 11 or 12. It is generally played by high schools in rural areas of the United States and Canada.

History
Six-man football was developed in 1934 by Stephen Epler in Chester, Nebraska, as an alternative means for small high schools to field a football team during the Great Depression. The first game was played on Thursday, September 27, 1934, at the Hebron, Nebraska Athletic Gridiron, under the lights, with a crowd of almost 1000 watching. This game was played so that coaches all over Kansas and Nebraska could see if they wanted to try this new game of six-man. The two teams playing in the game were the combined team from Hardy-Chester ("Hard-Chests") and a combined team from Belvidere-Alexandria ("Belvalex"). The two teams had two weeks to practice prior to this game; the two teams played to a 19-19 tie. After that night, rules for the game were distributed to about 60,000 coaches in the United States.

On October 5, 1940, Windham High School from Windham, Ohio, defeated Stamford Collegiate of Niagara Falls, Ontario, 39-1 in the first international six-man football game.

Notable six-man players
Jack Pardee (April 19, 1936 – April 1, 2013) began his football career as a teenager in Christoval, Texas, where he excelled as a member of the six-man football team.[1] He was an All-American linebacker at Texas A&M University and a two-time All-Pro with the Los Angeles Rams (1963) and the Washington Redskins (1971). He was one of the few six-man players to ever make it to the NFL, and his knowledge of that wide-open game served him well as a coach. Pardee was inducted into the College Football Hall of Fame as a player in 1986. Following his playing career, Pardee went on to coach, becoming the only head coach to helm a team in college football, the National Football League, the United States Football League, the World Football League, and the Canadian Football League.
Ed Sprinkle (September 3, 1923 – July 28, 2014) played six-man football at Tuscola High School in 1939, and became known to many as "The Meanest Man in Pro Football", nicknamed "the Claw". Prior to his NFL career, Sprinkle won three letters in football and two in basketball and earned All-Border Conference while at Hardin–Simmons University in the early 1940s. He earned all-Eastern honors in 1943 while attending the United States Naval Academy. He played for 12 seasons with the Chicago Bears of the National Football League and is credited with calling attention to the NFL's defensive players. At first, he played on both defense and offense. He caught 32 passes for 451 yards and seven touchdowns during his professional career. His ability to rush opposing quarterbacks, however, made him a defensive specialist, earning four Pro Bowls.

Game play

There are two versions of six-man football, one American and one Canadian.

Six-man American football is played on an 80-yard-long (73-m) by 40-yard-wide (37-m) field in most circumstances; the high school rulebook allows games to be held on a normal 100-yd (91-m) by 53-yd (48.8-m) field used in 11-man football if the teams and leagues so choose.  Furthermore, the game specifies a 15-yard distance (14-m) from the line of scrimmage to gain a first down, instead of the normal 10 yards (9 m).

Six-man Canadian football is similar, but the length of the field can be either 100 or 110 yards long by 40 yards wide. End zones can be either 10 yards or up to 20 yards deep. Normal 12-man Canadian fields are 110 yards long and 65 yards wide, with 20-yard end zones. The standard 12-man Canadian game specifies the standard 10-yard distance to gain a first down, with the offense provided three downs to gain sufficient yardage rather than four downs as in the American game; this remains unchanged in the six-man variant.

All six players are eligible to be receivers in the American game, while in the Canadian game, the player in the centre of the offensive line is ineligible. On offense, three linemen are required on the line of scrimmage at the start of the play. The player to whom the ball is snapped cannot advance the ball past the line of scrimmage (thus eliminating such plays as the bootleg or scramble); however, if the ball is tossed to another player, that player can run or throw the ball and the player to whom the ball was snapped is still an eligible receiver. All forward passes to the player who snapped the ball (center) must travel at least 1 yard (1 m) in flight.

Scoring
Six-man American football scoring is the same as in 11-man football, with the exceptions being on the point after touchdown (PAT) attempt and the field goal. A point-after kick is worth two points, while a conversion made by running or passing the ball is worth one point; this is the opposite of standard 11-man football. In addition, a field goal is worth four points instead of three. These rule changes were made because of the difficulty of successfully getting a kick off with so few blockers on the line compared to the number of defenders. Six-man Canadian football also inverts the point values of PATs and conversions, but retains the three-point field goal; additionally, the Canadian game also retains the one-point rouge that is unique to the Canadian game.

In both University Interscholastic League and Texas Association of Private and Parochial Schools competition, a 45-point "mercy rule" exists to prevent lopsided scoring deficits (no such rule exists in the standard 11-man game in Texas). The game is ended under this rule if a team is losing by 45 or more points at halftime or at any point after. The mercy rule is alluded to in the title of the David Morse film about six-man football, The Slaughter Rule. In Canada, a 35-point mercy rule is used that changes the clock to be constantly running rather than ending the game immediately.

Scoring tends to be much higher in the six-man game compared to its 11-man counterpart; games in which one team scores 100 points or more, now extremely rare in 11-man, regularly occur several times a year in six-man.

Six-man football today
As of the 2017–2018 alignments from UIL, TAPPS, TAIAO, TCAF, and T-CAL, the state of Texas has 262 six-man football teams (69 in UIL Division I, 69 in UIL Division II, 52 in TAPPS 19 in TAIAO, 18 in TCAF and 17 in T-CAL);, this does not count schools in other high-school leagues, or schools playing "outlaw schedules" (schools whose enrollment is too large to play six-man football in a league-sanctioned district, but nevertheless continue to organize a six-man team as opposed to an 11-man team).

Texas Charter School Academic and Athletic League (TCSAAL) held its inaugural Six-Man Football Varsity State Championship on November 20, 2015, at East View High School in Georgetown, Texas, in which Inspired Vision Academy defeated West Columbia Charter School for the championship.

TCSAAL held its second annual Six-Man Football State Championship on November 14, 2016, at Warrior Stadium at South Grand Prairie High School in Grand Prairie. Inspired Vision Academy lost to UME Preparatory Academy 999-0 (the scoreboard could only display three digits) for their second consecutive TCSAAL Six-Man Varsity State Championship.

The state of Florida has 32 teams playing six-man football in the Florida Christian Association of Private and Parochial Schools. FCAPPS comprises small Christian or private schools and at least one home-school cooperative. Teams in the conference are as far south as the Florida Keys to as far north as Jacksonville.

The state of Alabama has eight teams playing as part of the Christian Football Association (www.cfafootball.org) which is a sister organization to the Alabama Christian Education Athletic Association (ACEAA).

The state of Colorado has 23 teams currently playing six-man football, with the majority of teams being from small towns located in eastern Colorado.

As of 2013, Idaho has two teams that play six-man football; they play against makeshift junior varsity teams or teams in Montana.  Idaho has not sanctioned six-man football, but approved it for a pilot program.  It was made particularly for schools that were small and too far removed geographically to have a reasonable co-operative program with a neighboring school.  Idaho did play six-man football in the 1940s.

The sport is also played by high schools in Kansas, Montana, Nebraska, New Mexico, North Dakota, Oregon, and Wyoming, and in parts of Canada.

As of 2013, no leagues (professional, semiprofessional, or amateur) play the game past the high-school level. The last one, the San Antonio-based Texas Sixman Football League, converted to eight-man football after the 2012 season. The Central Florida-based Southeastern Christian Association of Sixman Football ceased operations in the late 2000s, and the Pennsylvania 6-Man Football League also converted to eight-man around the same time.

Currently, a women's league is playing six-(wo)man football – the Independent Women's Football League.

Six-man football in books
In 2005, coach C.H. Underwood authored what is considered to be the definitive strategy and play book for the game, Six Man Football, published by Bright Sky Press.  A player during the 1960s and coach of the first Texas State Six-Man Championship team in 1972, Underwood provides a thorough dissertation on the small-town sport from both analytical and historical perspectives.

Another Bright Sky Press book, published in 2003, Grit and Glory: Six-Man Football, is a collection of photographs that capture the spirit of the game and its players. Grit and Glory exclusively showcases the work of art photographer Laura Wilson, mother of actors Owen, Luke, and Andrew Wilson.

The newest release on the topic of six-man football is titled Six: A Football Coach's Journey to a National Record.  The book was authored by Marc Rasmussen and published by the South Dakota State Historical Society Press.  It includes a detailed history of Stephen Epler, the inventor of the sport, and follows the life of Willis "Bill" Welsh, who led a team from little Claremont, South Dakota, to a national record for consecutive wins between 1947 and 1953. More information is available on the South Dakota State Historical Society Press webpage (www.sdshspress.com).

In 2009, Dee Kelly, wrote a fictional book, A Good Man's Sin, based on a boy moving from the city to the country and playing six-man football in Indian Gap, Texas, before making it to the NFL. It explains the rules of the game and small-town football. It portrays the mid-1970s six-man football teams in central Texas consistently to the teams of that time when Cherokee and Marathon were powerhouses.

Barefoot, Bloodied and Bruised: The Amazing Story of Louisiana Six-Man Football is a self-published paperback written by longtime Louisiana football coach Barrett Murphy in 2014.  This book is about six-man football adopted by small schools in rural Louisiana during the 1940s and 1950s. The backstories and the stories of the games themselves highlight the values of the times and provide poignant, funny, and inspirational lessons about how football shaped the lives of many who became part of the Greatest Generation.

Six-man football in film
The Slaughter Rule, released in 2002, used six-man football as played in Montana as the backdrop for an examination of the relationship between a fatherless renegade football player and his loner coach. The film contains a brief but adequate explanation of how the game of six-man football is played, as well as footage of actual game sequences. The title refers to a rule in which a game is called in the second half if one team gains a 45-point advantage over the other.  In other states, it is referred to as the mercy rule. When invoked, one team is said to have "45ed" the other.

Six Man, Texas, released in 2008, is a documentary film that explores six-man football as identity in the public high schools of the 160 small towns in Texas that play it.

The Seventh Man, released in 2003, documents two years in the lives of the Panther Creek Panthers, one of the storied programs in Texas six-man football.  It features the narration of Val Kilmer.

A Texas-6 CBS documentary looks at the 2019 Strawn, Texas Greyhounds, who had won four titles and were trying to repeat with the coach who made it all happen.

See also
Eight-man football
Nine-man football
List of six-man football stadiums in Texas

References

External links
sixmanfootball.com
Lone Star Football Network
Southeastern Christian Association of Sixman Football
Bright Sky Press
sdshspress.com

Variations of American football
1934 introductions